The Appenzell Alps are a mountain range in Switzerland on the northern edge of the Alps. They extend into the cantons of Appenzell Ausserrhoden, Appenzell Innerrhoden and St. Gallen and are bordered by the Glarus Alps to the west and the Rätikon to the south-east.

Sub-ranges
The range is split up into six sub-ranges:
 Alpstein, central group, highest summit: Altmann, 2,435 m
 Alpstein, northern group, highest summit: Säntis, 2,502 m
 Alpstein, southern group, highest summit: Roslen- or Saxerfirst, 2,151 m
 Alviergruppe, highest summit: Gamsberg, 2,385 m
 Churfirsten, highest summit: Hinterrugg, 2,306 m
 Speer - Mattstock, highest summit: Speer, 1,950 m

Geography

Principal summits
The principal summits of the Appenzell Alps are:

 Säntis, 2,502 m
 Girenspitz, 2,448 m
 Altmann, 2,436 m
 Gamsberg, 2,385 m
 Fulfirst, 2,384 m
 Wildhuser Schafberg, 2,373 m
 Wisswand, 2,346 m
 Alvier, 2,343 m
 Gauschla, 2,310 m
 Hinterrugg, 2,306 m
 Brisi, 2,279 m
 Frümsel, 2,267 m
 Zuestoll, 2,235 m
 Margelchopf, 2,163 m
 Silberplatten, 2,158 m
 Hundstein, 2,157 m
 Schibestoll, 2,136 m
 Leistchamm, 2,101 m
 Gamser Rugg, 2,076 m
 Kreuzberge, 2,065 m
 Marwees, 2,056 m
 Lütispitz, 1,987 m
 Speer, 1,950 m
 Mattstock, 1,936 m
 Schäfler, 1,924 m
 Federispitz, 1,865 m
 Gonzen, 1,830 m
 Hoher Kasten, 1,795 m
 Gulmen, 1,789 m
 Stockberg, 1,781 m
 Kronberg, 1,663 m
 Ebenalp, 1,640 m
 Hochalp, 1,521 m

Other interesting summits

 Kamor, 1,751 m
 Tanzboden, 1,443 m
 Chrüzegg, 1,314 m
 Gäbris, 1,247 m
 Hörnli, 1,133 m
 Köbelisberg, 1,131 m
 Bachtel, 1,115 m

Gallery

See also
Swiss Alps

External links
 The Appenzell Alps on SummitPost

 
Landforms of Appenzell Ausserrhoden
Landforms of Appenzell Innerrhoden
Landforms of the canton of St. Gallen
Mountain ranges of the Alps
Mountain ranges of Switzerland